Jazz for "Breakfast at Tiffany's" is the third album by American jazz saxophonist Eddie Harris recorded in 1961, featuring a jazz interpretation of Henry Mancini's score for Breakfast at Tiffany's, and released on the Vee-Jay label.

Reception
The Allmusic review states "although Harris comes up with plenty of fresh ideas, he also never leaves the melody far behind".

Track listing
All compositions by Henry Mancini except as indicated
 "Moon River" (Henry Mancini, Johnny Mercer) -  5:54 
 "Something for a Cat" - 2:18 
 "Sally's Tomato" - 1:11 
 "Mr. Yunioshi" - 3:21 
 "The Big Blow Out" - 4:35 
 "Hub Caps and Tail Lights" - 2:19 
 "Breakfast at Tiffany's" - 5:00 
 "Latin Go Lightly" - 1:51 
 "Holly" - 2:26 
 "Loose Caboose" - 1:39 
 "The Big Heist" - 3:07

Personnel
Eddie Harris - tenor saxophone
Jon Avant - trombone
Charles Stepney - vibraphone
Willie Pickens - piano
Joe Diorio - guitar
Donald Garrett - bass
Earl Thomas - drums

References 

Eddie Harris albums
1961 albums
Vee-Jay Records albums